Barancs may refer to:

 Zemplínsky Branč, a village in Slovakia
 Braničevo, a toponym in Serbia